Valeria Mancinelli (born 13 March 1955) is an Italian politician.

She is a member of the Democratic Party. Mancinelli was elected Mayor of Ancona on 11 June 2013 and re-confirmed for the second term on 25 June 2018. She is the first woman to be elected mayor of the city of Ancona.

She won the 2018 World Mayor Prize.

See also
2013 Italian local elections
2018 Italian local elections
List of mayors of Ancona

References

External links
 
 

1955 births
Living people
Mayors of Ancona
People from Ancona
Democratic Party (Italy) politicians